Bogoda may refer to:
 Bogoda Bleeker, 1853, a genus of fishes in the family Ambassidae, synonym of Chanda
 Bogoda Blyth, 1860, a genus of fishes in the family Priacanthidae, synonym of Priacanthus
 , a settlement in Kurunegala District, Sri Lanka
 Bogoda Seelawimala Thera, a Buddhist priest, who is the current Chief Sangha Nayaka of Great Britain
 Bogoda Wooden Bridge, the oldest surviving wooden bridge in Sri Lanka

See also 
 Bogota (disambiguation)